Joseph Gilles Camille "Gil" Mayer (August 24, 1930 – September 29, 2015) was a Canadian professional ice hockey goaltender. He played 9 games in the National Hockey League with the Toronto Maple Leafs between 1949 and 1956. The rest of his career, which lasted from 1946 to 1963, was mainly spent in the American Hockey League (AHL). Mayer stood 5'6" tall, and weighed 128 lbs, which earned him the nickname "The Needle." During his time with the Cleveland Barons, Mayer became the first AHL goaltender to wear a mask.

Early life and junior career
Mayer was born on August 24, 1930, in Ottawa, Ontario, Canada. He began playing goaltender at the age of six due to liking the position. Mayer then played amateur hockey with the Hull Volants of the Ottawa City Hockey League and Lake Placid Roamers, an independent, intermediate senior level ice hockey team. During his time with the Roamers, he was noticed by Johnny Gagnon who helped place him with the Barrie Flyers.

Mayer subsequently made the jump from amateur hockey with the Lake Placid Roamers to junior ice hockey in 1949. He was the goalie of the Barrie Flyers who lost the Eastern Canada championship final series 5-4 to the Montreal Royals. He was subsequently the recipient of the  George Richardson Memorial Trophy and Red Tilson Trophy. He began his professional hockey career in 1949 with the Pittsburgh Hornets after his playing rights were purchased from the Montreal Canadiens. Due to his short stature, he was given the nickname "Needle" by the team.

Professional career

Pittsburgh Hornets and Toronto Maple Leafs
During his first year with the Hornets in the American Hockey League (AHL), Mayer led all goaltenders with an average of 2.50 goals in 22 games after replacing Baz Bastien. As a result of his play, Mayer made his NHL debut with the Toronto Maple Leafs against the Detroit Red Wings on December 1, 1949. During his debut, the Ottawa Citizen reported that they received dozens of telephone calls for the score of the Detroit-Toronto game and to know whether or not Mayer was in the Leafs' nets in place of Turk Broda. 

During the 1950–51 season, Mayer nearly surpassed Nick Damore's league shutout record after recording three consecutive shutouts. During a game against the Providence Reds on December 16, 1950, Mayer required a shutout within the first period to beat the record. However, Reds winger Chuck Scherza scored a goal after 12 minutes of play and the Hornets lost 3–2. As a result of his play during the season, Mayer was named to the 1951 AHL All-Star Team.

Early in the second period of Pittsburgh's game against the Syracuse Warriors, on February 6, 1952, Mayer was cut by a puck which struck his face. His nose haemorrhaged but he returned to the ice after thirty minutes. He finished the season second to Johnny Bower in goals against average with 2.57 goals within 68 games and topped the league in shutouts. The following year, he won the Harry "Hap" Holmes Memorial Award and a $300 bonus with a 3.25 goals against average. He allowed 146 goals in 52 games. During his career he was on 3 Calder cup winning teams; 2 with the Pittsburgh Hornets and 1 with the Hershey Bears. 

During his final season with the Hornets, coach Howie Meeker began to become frustrated with his "indifferent play." Following two loses, Meeker fined Mayer $100 for his play and sent him home prior to a game against the Springfield Indians. In response, Mayer said, "I try awfully hard, but I'm not the only player on the team." Despite this, Mayer was the 1956 recipient of the Harry "Hap" Holmes Memorial Award for the fourth time in five seasons after averaging 2.70 goals per game.

Hershey Bears
Mayer was traded to the Hershey Bears on July 5, 1956. The Bears also obtained from Pittsburgh defenceman Jack Price, centres Willie Marshall, Bob Hassard, and forward Bobby Solinger.  After being dissatisfied with the terms of his contract, Mayer left Hershey's pre-season training camp and was placed under suspension. As a result, his debut season was held off for a few days due to a contract dispute. During his first season with the Bears, Mayer suffered a knee injury and required weeks to recover. As part of his rehabilitation, Mayer traveled to Harrisburg, Pennsylvania every day to get into a whirlpool bath at the Harrisburg hospital. 

In 1958, the Detroit Red Wings asked the Bears to loan Mayer to the Edmonton Flyers as an emergency goaltender. After refusing to travel to Edmonton, Mayer was benched by coach Frank Mathers and fined $200 as a disciplinary measure.

Cleveland Barons and Providence Reds 
As goalie of the Cleveland Barons he sustained a broken jaw during practice and missed three weeks of competition in 1959. Following this, Mayer became the first goalie in the AHL to wear a Goalie mask. The mask had been sent to him from Jacques Plante, the first NHL goaltender to wear a mask. 

During the 1962–63 season, Mayer was replaced by Eddie Giacomin as the starting goaltender and subsequently found a stable job with a rug company. As the Reds lost 12 of their 15 games the following season with Giacomin in net, they asked Mayer to step in as the starting goaltender but he refused. Mayer listed his age, a good job, and his long period of inactivity as the reasons for his refusal. As a result, he was suspended from the team.

Size
Gil stood 5'6" and weighed between 128 and 135 pounds during his career. He was "nicknamed "The Needle". Mayer had a natural weight of 128 pounds but tipped the scales at 166 pounds wearing all of his equipment. The 38 pounds of steel, wood, leather and wool costs $300 and required 30 minutes for dressing and removal.

Career statistics

Regular season and playoffs

References

External links
 
AHL Hall of Fame Bio
Habs goalies bio

1930 births
2015 deaths
Barrie Flyers players
Canadian ice hockey goaltenders
Cleveland Barons (1937–1973) players
Hershey Bears players
Ice hockey people from Ottawa
Pittsburgh Hornets players
Providence Reds players
Toronto Maple Leafs players